Provodín is a municipality and village in Česká Lípa District in the Liberec Region of the Czech Republic. It has about 700 inhabitants.

Administrative parts
The village of Srní u České Lípy is an administrative part of Provodín.

References

External links

Villages in Česká Lípa District